Erna Björk Sigurðardóttir (born 30 December 1982) is an Icelandic former footballer who played as a defender. She was part of Iceland's national team and competed in UEFA Women's Euro 2009. Erna captained Breiðablik. She retired after the 2009 season but her last match was with the national team against Portugal in the 2010 Algarve Cup.

Achievements 
Three times Icelandic champion with Breiðablik, 2000, 2001 and 2005.
Three times Icelandic cup winner with Breiðablik, 1998, 2000 and 2005.

Honours 
Chosen Player of the Year in Breiðablik in 2003 and 2006.

References

1982 births
Living people
Erna Bjork Sigurdardottir
Erna Bjork Sigurdardottir
Women's association football defenders